Shahbazpur is a village in Shaheed Bhagat Singh Nagar district of Punjab State, India. The village is administrated by Sarpanch an elected representative of the village.

Demography 
As of 2011, Shahbazpur has a total number of 194 houses and population of 987 of which 487 include are males while 500 are females according to the report published by Census India in 2011. The literacy rate of Shahbazpur is 75.56% lower than the state average of 75.84%. The population of children under the age of 6 years is 95 which is 9.63% of total population of Shahbazpur, and child sex ratio is approximately 827 as compared to Punjab state average of 846.

Most of the people are from Schedule Caste which constitutes 43.36% of total population in Shahbazpur. The town does not have any Schedule Tribe population so far.

As per the report published by Census India in 2011, 266 people were engaged in work activities out of the total population of Shahbazpur which includes 239 males and 27 females. According to census survey report 2011, 94.74% workers describe their work as main work and 5.26% workers are involved in Marginal activity providing livelihood for less than 6 months.

Education 
KC Engineering College and Doaba Khalsa Trust Group Of Institutions are the nearest colleges.

List of schools nearby
Govt Upper Primary with Secondary School, Kot Ranjha
Govt Upper Primary with Secondary/Higher Secondary School, Jadla
Govt Primary School, Chhokran
Govt Primary School, Ranewal

Transport 

See also 
List of villages in India

References

External links 
 Tourism of Punjab
 Census of Punjab
 Locality Based PINCode

Villages in Shaheed Bhagat Singh Nagar district